Mareuil (Limousin: Maruelh), known locally as Mareuil-sur-Belle, is a former commune in the Dordogne department in Nouvelle-Aquitaine in southwestern France. On 1 January 2017, it was merged into the new commune Mareuil en Périgord. It was the birthplace of the troubadour Arnaut de Mareuil and of historian Michel Tardieu (born 1938).

Population

See also
Communes of the Dordogne department

References

Former communes of Dordogne